Rouffiac-d'Aude is a commune in the Aude department in southern France,  south of Carcassonne.

Population

Inhabitants are called Rouffiacois.

See also
Communes of the Aude department

References

Communes of Aude